Owando Airport  is an airport serving the town of Owando, the capital of the Cuvette Department in the Republic of the Congo.

The disused Runway 09/27 abuts the southeast end of the new runway.

See also

List of airports in the Republic of the Congo
Transport in the Republic of the Congo

References

External links

Owando Airport - OpenStreetMap

Cuvette Department
Airports in the Republic of the Congo